Heliodines roesella is a species of moth belonging to the family Heliodinidae.

It is native to Europe.

References

Heliodinidae
Moths described in 1758
Taxa named by Carl Linnaeus